is a former Japanese football player.

Club statistics

References

External links

1983 births
Living people
Fukuoka University alumni
Association football people from Kagoshima Prefecture
Japanese footballers
J1 League players
J2 League players
Kyoto Sanga FC players
Tokushima Vortis players
Giravanz Kitakyushu players
Association football defenders